Chucarosaurus (meaning "indomitable reptile") is an extinct genus of titanosaurian dinosaur from the Late Cretaceous (middle Cenomanian–lower Turonian) Huincul Formation of Argentina. The genus contains a single species, C. diripienda, known from various limb bones.

Discovery and naming 
The Chucarosaurus holotype specimen, MPCA PV 820, was discovered in sediments of the Huincul Formation, dated to the middle Cenomanian–lower Turonian ages of the late Cretaceous period, at Pueblo Blanco Natural Reserve in Río Negro Province, Argentina. The specimen consists of a complete left humerus, partial left radius, complete left metacarpal II, left ischium, partial left femur and fibula, partial right tibia, and partial indeterminate metapodial, all of which belong to one individual. An additional specimen (MPCA PV 821), consisting of a left femur and tibia, was also referred as a paratype.

In 2023, Agnolin et al. described Chucarosaurus diripienda, a new genus and species of colossosaurian titanosaurs, based on these fossil remains. The generic name, "Chucarosaurus", combines "chucaro", a Quechua word meaning  "hard and indomitable animal" with the Latin word "saurus", meaning "reptile". The specific name, "diripienda", is derived from a Latin word meaning "scrambled".

Description

Chucarosaurus was a large, slender-limbed titanosaur. The forelimb was shorter than the hind limb, with a humerus 78% the length of the femur, as is typical of titanosaurs but unlike some basal titanosauriforms such as brachiosaurids. As in other colossosaurs, the deltopectoral crest of the humerus was thickened in its distal half. The ischium has a shorter, more robust iliac peduncle than in other titanosaurs.

Classification 
Agnolin et al. (2023) recovered Chucarosaurus as a colossosaurian member of the Titanosauria, as the sister taxon to a clade formed by Notocolossus and the Lognkosauria. The results of their phylogenetic analyses are shown in the cladogram below:

Palaeoenvironment

Chucarosaurus is known from the Late Cretaceous Huincul Formation of Río Negro Province, Argentina. Many dinosaurs, including fellow titanosaurs (Argentinosaurus and Choconsaurus), rebbachisaurids (Cathartesaura and Limaysaurus), carcharodontosaurids (Mapusaurus, Meraxes, and Taurovenator), a megaraptoran (Aoniraptor), abelisaurids (Skorpiovenator, Tralkasaurus, and Ilokelesia), an elaphrosaurine (Huinculsaurus), a paravian (Overoraptor), and the unusual avetheropod Gualicho have also been named from the formation. Remains of unenlagiids, iguanodonts, and elasmarian ornithopods are also known.

References 

Titanosaurs
Fossil taxa described in 2023
Late Cretaceous dinosaurs of South America
Fossils of Argentina
Huincul Formation
Cretaceous Argentina